Don't Ask My Heart is a 1952 West German drama film directed by Paul Martin and starring Willy Birgel, Heidemarie Hatheyer and Maria Holst. It was shot at the Tempelhof Studios in West Berlin. The film's sets were designed by the art directors Hans Jürgen Kiebach and Gabriel Pellon

Cast
 Willy Birgel as Herr von Birkhausen
 Heidemarie Hatheyer as Anna Lohmann
 Maria Holst as Clarissa von Birkhausen
 Ewald Balser as Gerichts-Vorsitzender
 Paul Klinger as Paul Gerber
 Paul Hörbiger as Geheimrat Hollbach
 Rudolf Platte as Schmittke
 Oskar Sima as Morawski
 Ernst Waldow as Dr. Kuhnen - Anwalt
 Hilde Körber as Frau Bethke
 Loni Heuser as Nurse
 Ethel Reschke as Wally
 Otto Gebühr as Alter Bauer
 Paul Westermeier as Herr Bethke
 Herbert Wilk as Pfarrer
 Ernst Stahl-Nachbaur as Professor
 Otz Tollen as Diener
 Wolfgang Mahnke as Peter von Birkhausen
 Georg Dücker as Dr. Marlin - Anwalt
 Franz Fiedler
 Josef Kamper
 Charlotte Ander as Hausangestellte
 Gerhard Bienert as Wachtmeister
 Ernst Dernburg as Arzt
 Ida Perry
 Georg A. Profé

References

Bibliography 
 James Robert Parish. Film Actors Guide. Scarecrow Press, 1977.

External links 
 

1952 films
West German films
German drama films
1952 drama films
1950s German-language films
Films directed by Paul Martin
German black-and-white films
1950s German films
Films shot at Tempelhof Studios